Anastasia "Tasoula" Kelesidou (born 28 November 1972) is a Greek retired discus thrower best known for winning silver medals at the 2000 and 2004 Summer Olympics. During her career she set seven Greek records in discus throw, the best being 67.70 metres.

Her only international victory came at the 1997 Mediterranean Games.

Personal life 

She was born in Hamburg, West Germany. Her family hails from Strymonochori, Serres.

Honours

References

1972 births
Living people
Greek female discus throwers
Olympic athletes of Greece
Olympic silver medalists for Greece
Athletes (track and field) at the 1996 Summer Olympics
Athletes (track and field) at the 2000 Summer Olympics
Athletes (track and field) at the 2004 Summer Olympics
Medalists at the 2004 Summer Olympics
World Athletics Championships medalists
World Athletics Championships athletes for Greece
European Athletics Championships medalists
Athletes from Hamburg
Iraklis athletes
Medalists at the 2000 Summer Olympics
Olympic silver medalists in athletics (track and field)
Mediterranean Games gold medalists for Greece
Athletes (track and field) at the 1997 Mediterranean Games
Mediterranean Games medalists in athletics